Justine Ozga (born 31 January 1988) is a German former tennis player.

Ozga was born in Gliwice, Poland. In her career, she won two singles and eight doubles titles on the ITF Circuit. On 15 October 2007, she reached her best singles ranking of world No. 259. On 20 September 2010, she peaked at No. 214 in the doubles rankings.

ITF Circuit finals

Singles: 7 (2 titles, 5 runner-ups)

Doubles: 21 (8 titles, 13 runner-ups)

References

External links
 
 
 

1988 births
Living people
Sportspeople from Gliwice
German people of Polish descent
German female tennis players